Paracymoriza naumanniella is a moth in the family Crambidae. It was described by Wolfgang Speidel, Ulf Buchsbaum and Michael A. Miller in 2005. It is found on Lombok, Indonesia.

References

Acentropinae
Moths described in 2005